Hydrocanthus oblongus is a species of burrowing water beetle in the family Noteridae. It is found in the Caribbean Sea and North America.

References

Further reading

 
 
 
 
 

Noteridae
Articles created by Qbugbot
Beetles described in 1882